LWE may denote:
 Learning with errors, a computational problem used in cryptography
 Lightweight Ethernet, a nickname for the IEC 61162-450 protocol
 Latin World Entertainment
 the ISO 639 code for the Lewo Eleng language
 the IATA code for Wonopito Airport
 Lincoln-Way East High School